Scythris lagunae is a moth of the family Scythrididae. It was described by Eberhard Jäckh in 1978. It is found in Italy and France.

References

lagunae
Moths described in 1978